Girkan (also Romanized as Gīrkān; also known as Gīrgān) is a village in Bajgan Rural District, Aseminun District, Manujan County, Kerman Province, Iran. At the 2006 census, its population was 225, in 42 families.

References 

]

Populated places in Manujan County